John Ross Gillespie  (2 June 1935 – 29 January 2023) was a New Zealand field hockey player and coach. Gillespie represented New Zealand at the Summer Olympics twice as a player, in 1960 and 1964. He was head coach of the New Zealand field hockey team at 1972 Summer Olympics and of the gold medal winning team four years later in 1976.

In the 1977 New Year Honours, Gillespie was appointed a Member of the Order of the British Empire (MBE), for services to hockey.

Gillespie was born in Timaru. He died in Christchurch on 29 January 2023, aged 87.

References

External links
 

1935 births
2023 deaths
New Zealand male field hockey players
Olympic field hockey players of New Zealand
Field hockey players at the 1960 Summer Olympics
Field hockey players at the 1964 Summer Olympics
New Zealand field hockey coaches
Sportspeople from Timaru
New Zealand Members of the Order of the British Empire
Coaches at the 1976 Summer Olympics
Coaches at the 1972 Summer Olympics